Kishtwar district is a district of the Indian union territory of Jammu and Kashmir. As of 2011, it is the largest and least populous district of Jammu and Kashmir.

Geography
The district is bordered by Kargil district in the east and north, Chamba district to the south, and Anantnag and Doda districts to the west. The Chenab river flows through the district, forming the Chenab valley in the southern areas of the district. The Marusudar river, a tributary of Chenab, also flows through the district.

History 

Kishtwar is first referred to in the Rajatarangini by the ancient name Kashthavata during the reign of Raja Kalsa of Kashmir (1063–1089), when "Uttamaraja", the ruler of Kashthavata visited the court of the Kashmir King in company with several other hill chiefs to pay their respects to the Raja. 
This place, as said by people, is also mentioned in the epic Mahabharata.

Kishtwar was part of the Jammu state during the rule of Maharaja Ranjit Dev.

Kishtwar became part of the Jammu Dogra state of Raja Gulab Singh, when he annexed it in 1821. The local ruler of this place, Mohammed Tegh Singh, was sent to prison in Lahore jail, where he killed himself. The Dogra state eventually became the princely state of Jammu and Kashmir. With the passage of time, Kishtwar became a Tehsil of the Udhampur district and remained so until 1948, when it became part of the newly created District Doda in the wake of first re-organization of the state during the post-independence period.

Administration
Kishtwar district consists of 4 Sub-Divisions, 11 tehsils, and 13 blocks.

Following are the blocks: Marwah, Warwan, Dachhan, Kishtwar, Nagseni, Drabshalla, Inderwal, Mughal Maidan, Bonjwah, Machail, Palmar, Thakrie Trigham, and Paddar.

Each block consists of several panchayats. Block Kishtwar is the 1st block of Kishtwar District and Beron Town 1st Kishtwar is the 1st panchayat of Block Kishtwar, Beron town panchayat consists of Panditgam, Zewar, Nagdera, Bucherwal Mohalla, Semmna and Wazgwari. Marwah consists of 12 panchayats 1. Nowpachi, 2.Nowgam, 3.Yourdu, 4. Pethgam, 5.Ranie A, 6. Ranie B, 7. Quderna A, 8 Quderna B, 9 Chanjer, 10. Dehrana, 11. Hanzal, 12.Teller.

Following are the sub-divisions and tehsils:

Kishtwar Sub-district:
Kishtwar tehsil
Drabshalla tehsil
Bunjwah tehsil
Nagseni Tehsil

Chhatroo Sub-district:
Chhatroo tehsil
Mughal Maidan Tehsil

Marwah Sub-district:
Warwan tehsil
Dachhan tehsil
Marwah Tehsil

Atholi (Paddar) Sub-district:
Paddar tehsil is the most remote tehsil of the district, towered by the Sickle Moon Peak.
Machail

Politics
Kishtwar District has 3 assembly constituencies: Gulabgarh, Inderwal and Kishtwar. Kishtwar district is part of the Udhampur (Lok Sabha constituency). The present MP of Udhampur Constituency is Dr. Jitendra Singh of the BJP.

Demographics

According to the 2011 census Kishtwar district has a population of 230,696. This gives it a ranking of 586th in India (out of a total of 640). Its population growth rate over the decade 2001-2011 was 21.06%. Kishtwar has a sex ratio of 938 females for every 1000 males, and a literacy rate of 58.54% (Male 71.75%, Female 44.13%).

The demography of district kishtwar is complex as compared to its neighbouring districts primarily because of the wide diversity in its population. In the past, Kishtwar was largely inhabited by kishtwari population before people started settling here from Kashmir and other adjoining areas.The reasons for kashmiri population settling here in the past in 17th and 18th century is matter of ambiguity between historians.[8] However Sumantra Bose says it was repression by feudal class that drew people to the district of Doda, Ramban and Kishtwar.[9][10

Muslims are in majority with nearly 58%. Hindus are 41%. There is a small percentage of Buddhists in the far-eastern areas of the district who are the Bhotias.

Economy
The economy of the area is not regularized with no visible investment from the government. The area is rural in nature has an agricultural-based economy. Due to the dry nature of the climate, the village peasant population usually grows wheat and barley in Rabi (winter) season and Rajma (kidney bean) and maize in Kharif (rainy) season. Kishtwar has the distinction of producing world-class blue Diamond Sapphire and its Kashmir sapphire was mined at Padder valley. The area is although rich in natural mineral resources but poor infrastructure has posed difficulty in its extraction. Mineral gypsum is mined at Village Trigam. The river sand of Chenab is of the best quality and used extensively for construction purposes.

The Padder area produces world-class Pine nuts called chilgoza which is a delicacy and costly dry fruit. In Marwah, Chhatroo, Mughalmaidan and Bounjwah tehsils, walnut production of best quality walnuts in thousands of tons is recorded, but due to the absence of any fruit Mandi, exact figures are not available. Besides walnut, Marwah tehsil produces thousands of tons of Rajma (kidney beans) which is the cash crop of the area. Villages of Pochhal, Matta and Hidyal produce saffron of good quality. Rural households are also abundantly gifted by nature through cash crops of edible mushrooms and morchella called guchhi in the local language. Some families have been reported to earn more than Rs. 100,000 per year by just selling the dried Morchella in local markets. Edible ferns are also a natural cash crop of the area. Apples are produced in some areas.

The rivers are a rich source of hydroelectricity and the site of the hydroelectric power projects of Dul Hasti 390 MW, Ratle Hydroelectric Project 850 MW, Kirthai 1400 MW, Pakal Dool 1,000 MW, Lower Kalnai 48 MW and Chaudhary 15MW, Keeru HEPP and Kwar HEPP with the highest per capita wattage production in the world for such a small area. These projects have been the largest source of employment in the area and have immensely contributed to the prosperity of the area.

Tourism

The Chenab River flows through the district and is joined by tributaries such as the Marvisudar river of Marwah, Fambar Nallah, Chingam Nallah which meet at the confluence near Bhandarkoot. The rivers have cut steep gorges and wide plains on the way. Warwan and Marwah valleys are unique in being located in the way of river Marusudar.  The area is also known for its high mountain passes which have been the mountaineer's delight since the British era.  Many illustrations are found in the travelogue written by British writers including Otto Rothfield's With pen and Rifle in Kashmir.

The Kishtwar–Anantnag National Highway passes through the Sinthan Pass and Daksum Nowpachi Road passes through the Margan top a 13 km long and 5100-metre-high pass. The Steep Brahma mountain peak is situated at Dachhan which is documented by British mountaineers. The Warwan Valley has been rated among India's top ten trekking destinations with a wide range of landscapes. Saffron of purest quality is produced in the iron-rich soil at Pochhal, Matta, Lachdayaram and Hidyal.
Kishtwar National Park, in the northeast region of the district, has a large number of peaks and glaciers. The town has a small airstrip under the control and management of the Indian Army which caters to civil and military Helicopters. The 33-hectare Chowgan is the largest natural ground located in the centre of the city and is used as a venue for recreation and religious and political gatherings. Mini Secretariat housing all the offices of Kishtwar district administration is located 3 km from the main bus stand in Kuleed area. Kishtwar is endowed with dense forests of deodar, pine and fir. High altitude mountains are ranging between 20,000 feet to 21,000 feet like Nun Kun, Barhma. there are many peaks in Paddar like Cerro Kishtwar, Tipendai, Gupta Peak, Shivling Peak, Aushuko Peak, Omasla Peak etc.

There are many trekking routes in Paddar like Omasla trek, Kabbanla trek, Potla trek, Ashuko trek, Tundupla trek, Sarsangla trek, Mounla trek etc. and many sightseeings like Darllang Nalla, Bujas Nalla, Barnaj Nalla, Chandi Mata Mandir, Lossani Gompa, Naag Stone at Darlang Nalla.

Transportation

Air
Kishtwar Airport is a proposed airport in the district headquarters. The nearest airport to kishtwar is Jammu airport which is 211 km away from Kishtwar.

Rail
There is no railway connectivity to Kishtwar yet. The Udhampur–Doda–Kishtwar is a planned railway line for Doda and Kishtwar districts. The nearest major railway station is Udhampur railway station which is located 150 kilometres from district headquarters Kishtwar.

Road
Kishtwar district is well-connected to the winter capital Jammu and summer capital Srinagar by the NH 244 alongside other intra-district roads. The road to Srinagar passes through the picturesque Sinthan pass.

Notable people
Om Mehta, politician
G. M. Saroori, politician
Ghulam Haider Gagroo, poet and magistrate

See also
 Kishtwar
 Paddar
 Sinthan Top
 Chenab Valley
 Pir Panjal
 Jammu
 Batwas

References

Further reading

External links

 kishtwar.nic.in

 
Kishtwar
Chenab Valley